The  Dominican least gecko (Sphaerodactylus perissodactylius) is a species of lizard in the family Sphaerodactylidae. It is endemic to the Dominican Republic.

Distribution 

This species is only known from one locality in Sierra Martin Garcia.

References

Sphaerodactylus
Reptiles of the Dominican Republic
Endemic fauna of the Dominican Republic
Reptiles described in 1988